Baonine is a village in the municipality of Trebinje, Republika Srpska and partially in the municipality of Ravno, Bosnia and Herzegovina.

Demographics 
According to the 2013 census, its population was just 1, a Serb living in the Trebinje part.

References

Populated places in Ravno, Bosnia and Herzegovina
Populated places in Trebinje